Gulabi Bagh is one of the oldest and planned  residential areas that lies north of central Delhi, India, adjacent to Ashok Vihar, Shakti Nagar, Kamla Nagar, Karol Bagh. Famous for its greenery and fresh air, it is often characterized by its famous (monkey) park that is adjacent to it.

Gulabi Bagh is divided in mainly three locations. Delhi Development Authority (DDA) Flats, Delhi Government Flats and Sanjay nagar.

Delhi Government flats is a well developed residential area and has Super Market, Central Park, Community Center, Multi-Purpose Gym, Old Age amusement center, Government Offices.

While sanjay nagar is an upscale residential colony housing facilities like NKS Super Specialty hospital.

Gulabi Bagh DDA flat's area is also known for number of green parks in colony and fresh air.

Education

There are a couple of Primary and Senior Secondary Schools in Gulabi Bagh. Also Delhi university North Campus is situated nearby. Schools like Monfort or Presidium situated in neighbouring areas are too well within reach.

Greenery

This area is famous for its green cover. There is an abundance of parks contributing in fresh air. Population density is also well below Capital's average.

Connectivity

Situated more towards the center, its easy to go anywhere around the city and NCR. Gulabi bagh is well connected via metro Shastri nagar metro and Pratap Nagar metro Stations are well within reach. Bus Connectivity is also good. Roads and streets are wide enough.

Shopping

The colony itself has super markets to shop, still for more substantial shopping one can go to kamla nagar market or deep market which are just minutes away.

Medical Facilities

NKS Super Specialty hospital is situated in Sanjay Nagar colony of gulabi bagh. Also there are a couple of government dispensaries.

Neighbourhoods in Delhi